Trolls: Original Motion Picture Soundtrack is the soundtrack album to the 2016 DreamWorks Animation film Trolls, released on September 23, 2016 by RCA Records. The soundtrack is produced primarily by singer Justin Timberlake, Max Martin, and Shellback. It features work from Timberlake himself, along with Anna Kendrick, Ron Funches, Zooey Deschanel and Gwen Stefani, who all voice characters in the film, as well as Earth, Wind & Fire and Ariana Grande. The album was certified Platinum in Australia and Double Platinum in the United States. The song "Can't Stop the Feeling!" was nominated for an Academy Award and won a Grammy Award.

Background
After being announced as the voice to the lead character in the musical comedy Trolls opposite Anna Kendrick, Billboard reported that Justin Timberlake also signed on to write and perform original music for the film. Timberlake said in an interview:

By the time Timberlake joined the project, there was still some original music needed to be written for the film. Timberlake planned to cover the disco genre among the variety of pop songs present in the film. For the soundtrack album, Earth, Wind & Fire re-recorded "September" with Timberlake and Kendrick.

Commercial performance
The soundtrack peaked at number one on the ARIA Charts, three on the US Billboard 200 album chart, four on the New Zealand Albums Chart, and four on the UK Albums Chart. It received Platinum certifications by the Recording Industry Association of America and the Australian Recording Industry Association, and a Gold certification by the British Phonographic Industry. In the United States, it has sold 573,000 copies by April 2017, and was the year's tenth highest selling album in the country with 522,000 sold throughout 2017.

The lead single, "Can't Stop the Feeling!" performed by Justin Timberlake, was released on May 6, 2016, and reached number one on the official charts of 17 countries, including the US Billboard Hot 100.

In 2017, Trolls was ranked as the 11th most popular album of the year on the Billboard 200.

Two years after the soundtrack was released, it was ranked as the 80th most popular album of 2018 on the Billboard 200.

Accolades
Trolls was nominated for Best Soundtrack at the 2016 St. Louis Gateway Film Critics Association. For his work on the soundtrack, Justin Timberlake was nominated for Outstanding Music Supervision – Film, along with Best Soundtrack From a Movie, at the 2016 Hollywood Music in Media Awards. At the ceremony, "Can't Stop the Feeling!" won Best Song Written for an Animated Film. The album was nominated at the 2017 Billboard Music Awards for Top Soundtrack/Cast Album and at the American Music Awards for Top Soundtrack.

"Can't Stop the Feeling!" won the Grammy Award for Best Song Written for Visual Media, and was nominated for the Academy Award for Best Original Song. Timberlake received the Hollywood Song Award for "Can't Stop the Feeling!" at the 2016 Hollywood Film Awards. It was also nominated for the Golden Globe Award for Best Original Song, Critics' Choice Award for Best Song, and Satellite Award for Best Original Song.

Track listing

Score

Charts

Weekly charts

Year-end charts

Decade-end charts

Certifications

Release history

References

2016 soundtrack albums
RCA Records soundtracks
Soundtrack
Albums produced by Justin Timberlake
Albums produced by Max Martin
Albums produced by Ilya Salmanzadeh
Albums produced by Shellback (record producer)
Musical film soundtracks
Comedy film soundtracks